Fauveau is a French surname. Notable people with the surname include:

Félicie de Fauveau (1801–1886), French sculptor 
Johann Fauveau (born 1984), French Muay Thai kickboxer
Philippe Fauveau (born 1926), French rower

French-language surnames